Duane W. "Skip" Thoren (born April 5, 1943) is an American former professional basketball player. At a height of 6 ft 10 in (2.08 m) tall, he played at the center position.

High school
A native of Rockford, Illinois, Thoren attended Rockford East High School from 1957–58 to 1960–61 and led the E-Rabs to the "Elite 8" of the Illinois High School Association state basketball tournament, losing to the eventual state champion Collinsville High School in the quarterfinals of the 1961 tournament. Thoren led the E-Rabs to consecutive regional championships and 20 win seasons.

As a junior his team finished the season with an overall record of 21 wins and only 5 losses and a Big 8 Conference record of 7 wins and 3 losses, finishing in second place. Ironically this team would lose in the state tournament to conference opponent, Freeport in the IHSA sectional on March 9, 1960. In his 24 games as a junior, Thoren scored 513 points, averaging 19.7 points per game and was named second team all-conference at center.

As a senior, Thoren's team dominated the conference, losing only to East Aurora High School mid-season and finish the conference portion of the campaign with a 9–1 record. In the 28 games played during the season, Erickson played in 27 and lead the team in scoring at 632 points, averaging 23.4 points per game and he would be named first-team all-conference at the center position. When the conference portion of the season ended, the E-Rabs compiled an overall record of 20 wins and only 1 loss. During regional and sectional play, Thoren's team defeated all of the competition until the "Elite-Eight" where they lost to eventual champion Collinsville on the evening of March 17, 1961 at Huff Gymnasium in Champaign. Even though the E-Rabs only played two games in the tournament, Thoren was the ninth leading scorer with 43 points and Rockford East finished with an AP ranking of number 3. In his two years of varsity basketball, Thoren scored 1,145 points in 53 games, averaging 21.6 points per game. After the season, Thoren was
named to the All-State team.

College career
Thoren chose to play college basketball at the University of Illinois at Urbana–Champaign after high school and was a member of the freshman basketball team for the 1961–62 season. He played in every single game during his three-year career and was the starting center for the final two seasons, replacing Bill Burwell. As a sophomore during the 1962-63 season, Thoren joined fellow sophomore, Tal Brody and future Illini hall of fame athlete, Dave Downey, on a team that would finish with an overall record of 20–6 and a Big Ten record of 11 and 3, placing them in a tie for the conference championship. At the end of the regular season, Illinois would advanced to the NCAA tournament, playing in the Mideast Region. The Illini would defeat Bowling Green in the second round to earn a berth in the "Elite Eight", but would lose to eventual national champion Loyola, 79–64 at Jenison Fieldhouse.

In his junior season of 1963–64, the Fighting Illini would start the season with 10 wins and only 3 losses, however, the team would falter and lose seven of its next eight games, dropping them in the conference standings. During the season, on December 28, 1963 in a game versus UCLA, Thoren set the all-time single game rebounding record for Illinois with 24 rebounds. The Illini would finish the season 13–11 overall and 6–8 in the conference. After the season, Thoren was named second team All-Big Ten and was dubbed an Honorable Mention All-American team MVP as well as captain for the following season.

During Thoren's senior season, the Illini returned to their winning ways for 1964–65. Overall Illinois would finish the season with an 18–6 record while finishing third in the Big Ten with a 10–4 record, losing twice to top-ranked Michigan. During the season the team would win the Kentucky Invitational Tournament and finish the year with a Coaches ranking of number 16. After the season, Thoren would be named team MVP as well as 1st team All-Big Ten and 1st team All-American. During his playing time at Illinois, Thoren's teams would win 51 of 74 games and win the 1963 championship.

Thoren is recognized as a notable member of the athletic fraternity Beta Theta Pi Fraternity House (Champaign, Illinois).

Professional career
Thoren played three seasons (1967–1970) in the American Basketball Association (ABA), as a member of the Minnesota Muskies and Miami Floridians. He averaged 13.2 points per game and 11.0 rebounds per game, in his career, and appeared in the 1969 ABA All-Star Game.

Before playing in the ABA, Thoren played in Italy, with Simmenthal Milano, along with Bill Bradley, and he won the 1965–66 season FIBA European Champions Cup (EuroLeague) championship.

Honors

Basketball
 1964 - Team MVP
 1964 - 2nd Team All-Big Ten
 1964 - Honorable Mention All American
 1965 - Team Captain
 1965 - Team MVP
 1965 - 1st Team All-Big Ten
 1965 - 1st Team All American
 1974 - Inducted into the Illinois Basketball Coaches Association's Hall of Fame as a player.
 2004 - Elected to the "Illini Men's Basketball All-Century Team".
 2008 - Honored as one of the thirty-three honored jerseys which hang in the State Farm Center to show regard for being the most decorated basketball players in the University of Illinois' history.

Statistics

College

ABA career statistics

Regular season

Playoffs

All-star game

References

External links

1943 births
Living people
All-American college men's basketball players
American expatriate basketball people in Italy
American men's basketball players
Baltimore Bullets (1963–1973) draft picks
Basketball players from Illinois
Centers (basketball)
Illinois Fighting Illini men's basketball players
Miami Floridians players
Minnesota Muskies players
Olimpia Milano players
Parade High School All-Americans (boys' basketball)
Sportspeople from Rockford, Illinois